The first election to the Bridgend County Borough Council was held on 4 May 1995.  It was followed by the 1999 election.  On the same day there were elections to  the other 21 local authorities in Wales and community councils in Wales.

Overview
All council seats were up for election. These were the first elections held following local government reorganisation and the abolition of Mid Glamorgan County Council. The ward boundaries for the new authority were based on the previous Ogwr Borough Council although the St Brides Major ward had been transferred to the Vale of Glamorgan, reducing councillor numbers by one.

The result of the election was a strong majority for the Labour Party, who made gains across Wales.

|}

Candidates
Most sitting members of Mid Glamorgan County council sought election to the new authority. A number were also members of the previous district council but others contested a ward against a sitting district councillor.

KEY
o candidate previously elected to Ogwr Borough Council in 1991 
+ candidate previously elected to Mid Glamorgan Council in 1993

Ward Results
Contests took place in only 16 of the 28 wards, with councillors in 12 wards elected unopposed.

Bettws (one seat)

Blackmill (one seat)

Blaengarw (one seat)

Brackla (one seat)

Caerau (two seats)

Cefn Cribwr (one seat)

Coity Higher (two seats)

Cornelly (two seats)

Coychurch Lower (one seat)

Laleston/Merthyr Mawr (three seats)

Llangeinor (one seat)

Llangynwyd (one seat)

Maesteg East (two seats)

Maesteg West (two seats)

Morfa (two seats)

Nantyffyllon (one seat)

Nant-y-Moel (one seat)

Newcastle (two seats)

Newcastle Higher (one seat)

Ogmore Vale (one seat)

Oldcastle (two seats)

Pencoed (three seats)

Pontycymmer (one seat)

Porthcawl East (three seats)

Porthcawl West (four seats)

Pyle (three seats)

St Brides Minor (two seats)

Ynysawdre (one seat)

See also
 List of electoral wards in Bridgend County Borough

References

1995 Welsh local elections
1995